Nicolas "Nik" Viljoen (born 3 December 1976) is a New Zealand footballer who represented New Zealand at the international level.

Viljoen scored the winner after coming on as a substitute in his full All Whites debut, a 1-0 win over Oman on 29 September 1996 and ended his international playing career with 10 A-international caps and 3 goals to his credit, his final cap an appearance in a 0-2 loss to Indonesia on 21 September 1997.

References

External links

1976 births
Living people
Afrikaner people
New Zealand association footballers
New Zealand international footballers
New Zealand people of South African descent
Rotherham United F.C. players
Waitakere City FC players
English Football League players
Association football forwards